Tanisha Thomas (born August 28, 1985) is a reality television personality. She is best known for her appearance on the second season of the reality television series Bad Girls Club.

Bad Girls Club (2007)
In 2007, Tanisha Thomas sent in a casting tape to the casting directors of the Bad Girls Club, an American reality television series. Thomas was chosen to be one of the seven "bad girls," and filming took place in Los Angeles, California from August to November 2007. During the season, Thomas was quickly favored among fans of the show and her catchphrase "pop-off!" became her signature saying. Thomas also formed the clique "The Hyena Sisters" with Hanna Thompson and Neveen Ismail. The "party girls" clique —consisting of Jennavecia Russo, Sarah "Cordelia" Carlise, Melissa "Lyric" Greene and Darlen Escobar — was the hyena sisters' enemy in the house.

After Bad Girls Club 
In January 2011, Oxygen released OxygenLive!, an online talk show hosted by Thomas. It was broadcast after season six debuted on Oxygen, and focused on the cast of season six, occasionally bringing in "bad girls" from earlier seasons. Thomas asked the girls several questions to prompt rumors and confessions. Oxygen had renewed the dating game show Love Games: Bad Girls Need Love Too with Thomas as the host for the second season. The third season aired on December 5, 19000000. Both Koether and Steinfeldt were contestants on season six of Bad Girls Club; Jai was a contestant on season seven.

In 2011, SallyAnn Salsano wanted to film Thomas' wedding and her planning of it with her fiancé. Salsano and Joel Zimmer held a press conference to talk to Thomas about a possible television documentary based on her wedding planning. It follows Thomas and her finance, Clive Muir, as they prepare their wedding day. Thomas gave the okay and filming began shortly thereafter. It was later called Tanisha Gets Married and consisted of seven one-hour episodes airing on Mondays on Oxygen. Tanisha Gets Married premiered on Monday, May 7, 2012, after part two of season eight's reunion special. The show debuted with 1,073,000 viewers, becoming Oxygen's best ever freshman docu-series premiere, according to TV by the Numbers. Compared with Oxygen's time slots in April 2012, Tanisha Gets Married was a 96% increase in all Oxygen's key demos. According to SocialGuide, Tanisha Gets Married ranked number four on the most social series amongst all cable series.

Thomas was chosen by producers to host the two-part reunion special for Bad Girls Club season eight. She continued to host the reunions for recent seasons of Bad Girls Club and spinoff Bad Girls All-Star Battle.

Personal life
Thomas married Clive Muir at the Thatched Cottage on Long Island, New York on December 4, 2011. The couple separated approximately one month after their wedding and ended their marriage two years later, in 2014.

Tanisha has been very vocal and honest about having weight loss surgery.

In 2016, she began dating Carey St. Hilaire. In October 2017, Thomas announced she and St. Hilaire were expecting their first child together. On March 7, 2018, she gave birth to a baby boy named Aiden St. Hilaire. On April 23, 2018, she & St. Hilaire got engaged.

Other projects
Thomas and her then-husband Clive Muir appeared on Marriage Boot Camp for its first season, which premiered May 30, 2014.

Besides working on TV-related projects, Thomas is planning to release an online plus-sized clothing line under the mark "Plush Diva's Closet". She is also in the works to possibly begin executive-producing her own concept.

Thomas appeared on Baddies for its first season as an EP and baddie, yet departed from the series for its second season.

Thomas mentioned during an episode of Baddies that she had been offered by Oxygen to do BGCASB and she had refused due to the drama.

Television appearances

References

1985 births
Participants in American reality television series
American people of Grenadian descent
Living people
People from Brooklyn
African-American television personalities
21st-century African-American people
20th-century African-American people
Bad Girls Club